= Aleksandr Gaydin =

Russian footballer

Personal information
- Full name: Aleksandr Aleksandrovich Gaydin
- Date of birth: 26 October 1993 (age 33)
- Place of birth: Rostov-on-Don, Russia
- Height: 1.89 m (6 ft 2 1/2 in)
- Position: Defender

Senior career*
Years	Team	Apps	(Gls)
2010	RO UOR Rostov-on-Don		
2011	FC Sulin Krasny Sulin		
2012	FC Fakel Voronezh	1	(0)
2013–2014	FC SKVO Rostov-on-Don	4	(0)
- * Club domestic league appearances and goals

Aleksandr Aleksandrovich Gaydin (Russian: Александр Александрович Гайдин; born 26 October 1993) was born in Rostov-na-Donu and is a former Russian professional football player. Gaydin played as a center back.

== Club career ==
He made his Russian Football National League debut for FC Fakel Voronezh on 21 May 2012 in a game against FC KAMAZ Naberezhnye Chelny.
